Kunbaja ( or ) is a  village and municipality in Bács-Kiskun county, in the Southern Great Plain region of southern Hungary.

The village name reflects the presence of Kumans in this region.

Geography

Notable people 
Ivan Antunović, titular bishop, one of leaders of national revival of Croats from Bačka

External links
Village Page including history

Populated places in Bács-Kiskun County
Hungarian German communities